R&S Records is an independent record label founded in 1983 in Ghent, Belgium. R&S represents the initials of Renaat Vandepapeliere and Sabine Maes, the couple that created the label. R&S Records has had several subsidiaries, most notably Apollo Records, which was reactivated in 2009.

R&S and its subsidiaries include releases by Lone, Paula Temple, Joey Beltram, Capricorn, Aphex Twin, Biosphere, C.J. Bolland, Sun Electric, The Source Experience/Robert Leiner, Model 500/Juan Atkins, Silent Phase, System 7, Dave Angel, and Ken Ishii.

History
The label was first named as Milos Music Belgium but just one record was released on the label. Vandepapeliere went from DJing to developing the label in response to his personal irritation with the Belgian music scene while getting inspired by Belgian New Beat in the late 1980s:
"I worked in a record shop, but as a DJ I was getting very frustrated with the Belgian scene. The clubs were so commercial and American music just wasn't accepted. The guys that were importing records here, they went straight into the studio and created a bad cover of it. I didn't like that. I said 'Respect the artist. License it in, and let's have the original track'. That's where the idea to start the label started, and it was New Beat that gave me the chance."

In 2000, Vandepapeliere shut down the label. Speaking to Stuart Aitken in 2009, he explained his reasons for doing so. "I was bored. I'd had enough. So I went and did something else. I started my stud farm."

After a hiatus from 2001 to 2006, the label re-launched from its current London base with brand new releases from new artists like James Blake, Delphic, Pariah, Space Dimension Controller, Untold, Djrum, Blawan, Synkro, Lakker, Nicolas Jaar, Vondelpark, Radioslave and the return of Model 500/Juan Atkins.

When asked in an interview with Clash Magazine in November 2009 why the label went on hiatus,  Vandepapeliere explained:
"I've been away because I was totally bored with the business side of music. At that moment, I thought the whole dance music scene was repeating. I was listening to the same records with the same sounds, so I said 'I've had enough. Bye, bye'. I could have been a very clever businessman and exploited it. I could have made much more money, but if I don't feel something in my life - I stop."

In 2018, R&S Records released "Loyalty", the debut release from LA based soul trio Gabriels (Ari Balouzian, Ryan Hope and singer Jacob Lusk).

In February 2021, the record was accused of discrimination against black and female artists as well as support for an Anti-Semitic artist on the label's roster. However, the discrimination lawsuit was dismissed in May 2022 on a technicality.

See also 
 List of record labels

References

External links 

Belgian independent record labels
Record labels established in 1984
Electronic music record labels
Techno record labels
Ambient music record labels